The list of presidents of the University of Alberta, Edmonton, Alberta, Canada:
 Henry Marshall Tory (1908–1928)
 Robert C. Wallace (1928–1936)
 William A. R. Kerr (1936–1941)
 Robert Newton (1941–1950)
 Andrew Stewart (1950–1959)
 Walter H. Johns (1959–1969)
 Max Wyman (1969–1974)
 Harry Gunning (1974–1979)
 Myer Horowitz (1979–1989)
 Paul T. Davenport (1989–1994); W. John McDonald (acting) (1994–1995)
 Roderick D. Fraser (1995–2005)
 Indira Samarasekera (2005–2015)
 David Turpin (2015–2020)
 Bill Flanagan (2020–Present)

External links
 University of Alberta Past Presidents

 
Alberta